The 2011 Breeders' Cup World Championships was the 28th edition of thoroughbred racing's season ending premier event, and took place on November 4 and 5 at Churchill Downs in Louisville, Kentucky.

Friday
The Breeders' Cup races were part of a 10 race program with post time at 2:00 pm EST for the first race. The post time of the first Breeders' Cup race was 4:12 pm EST.
The attendance was 40,677.

Saturday
The Breeders' Cup races were part of a 12 race program with post time at 12:05 pm EST for the first race. The post time of the first Breeders' Cup race was 1:20 pm EST. The attendance was 65,143.

Highlights of the day's card was the attempt by Goldikova to win a fourth consecutive Breeders' Cup Mile in her last race. She was defeated into third place by 64–1 long shot Court Vision. Joseph O'Brien, son of famed Irish trainer Aidan O'Brien, became the youngest jockey to win a Breeders' Cup race (St Nicholas Abbey) at 18 years, 5 months, surpassing Fernando Jara, who was 18 years, 10 months old when he won the 2006 Classic on Invasor.

See also
 2011 Kentucky Derby

References

Breeders' Cup
Breeders' Cup, 2011
Breeders' Cup
Breeders' Cup